Ingrid Johansson  (born 9 July 1965) is a Swedish footballer who played as a midfielder for the Sweden women's national football team. She was part of the team at the 1989 European Competition for Women's Football and 1991 FIFA Women's World Cup. At the club level she played for Jitex BK in Sweden.

References

External links
 

1965 births
Living people
Swedish women's footballers
Sweden women's international footballers
Place of birth missing (living people)
1991 FIFA Women's World Cup players
Women's association football midfielders